William Montgomerie Bell (29 January 1813 – 16 September 1867) was a merchant and politician in colonial Victoria, Australia. He was Mayor of Melbourne in 1848 and 1849 and represented the district of Evelyn in the Victorian Legislative Assembly from January to March 1860.

References

1813 births
1867 deaths
English emigrants to colonial Australia
Members of the Victorian Legislative Assembly
Mayors and Lord Mayors of Melbourne
19th-century Australian politicians